Stephen Hodge may refer to:

 Stephen Hodge (cyclist) (born 1961), Australian cyclist
 Stephen Hodge (born 1987), American football player selected in the 2009 NFL Draft
 Stephen L. Hodge, American chief executive
 Steve Hodge (born 1962), English footballer